Wayne Chew (born 22 October 2001) is a Singaporean footballer currently playing as a goalkeeper for Geylang International.

Club

Geylang International
He made his professional debut on 17 November 2020 against Tanjong Pagar United in the Singapore Premier League, after being selected by head coach Noor Ali the day before the match.

Career statistics

Club

Notes

References

2001 births
Living people
Singaporean footballers
Singaporean sportspeople of Chinese descent
Association football goalkeepers
Singapore Premier League players
Geylang International FC players